The ASW 24 is a modern single-seat high-performance composite Standard Class sailplane. It is manufactured in Germany by Alexander Schleicher GmbH & Co.

History
The ASW 24 was designed by Schleicher's Gerhard Waibel, with Delft University professor Loek Boermans undertaking the role of aerodynamicist. The prototype made its first flight in 1987 and entered serial production later the same year. It nominally remained in production until 2000, although only a score were built in the mid-to-late 1990s.

It entailed a large development effort, as it was a complete departure from the preceding ASW 19 and pioneered several successful innovations. The fuselage, airfoils, wings and empennage were completely new, as well as many systems, e.g. the electrical ballast management. The structure employed a large amount of the then still exotic carbon fibre. The OSTIV Award-winning safety cockpit made use of an organic shape, tall sidewalls, crumple zones and exotic aramid fibres for crash protection. A large wheel with a disc brake and a large canopy with excellent visibility were other strong points of the type.

The ASW 24 was moderately successful in competitions. It won a single World Championship in 2001, fourteen years after its market launch. Like the contemporary LS7, the ASW 24 overstretched the technology available at the time: it has excellent performance in the cruise but less so in the slow flight range. The higher-than-usual thermalling speed revealed itself a disadvantage in the typical competition gaggles, and its performance degrades somewhat when subject to turbulence, rain or wing contamination. However, the addition of winglets and a change to the outer wing leading edge, making it slightly blunter (both of which have been applied to many earlier ASW 24s), improved these characteristics significantly. Third-party winglets available in the U.S. market, one of which is approved by the factory, brought the ASW 24 fully up to parity with its competitors. One unintended bonus of the design of the spar and use of aramid fibre in the wing is the wing profile is unusually stable over time. ASW 24s that are 25+ years old still have excellent airfoil profile integrity.

According to World Champion Sarah Steinberg, it needs to be always proactively flown in thermals, thus imposing a higher workload upon the pilot. Notwithstanding, the aesthetically pleasing ASW 24 is a comfortable, safe and pleasant sailplane with high cross-country performance that remains competitive up to national championship level in most countries.

The fuselage of the ASW 24 was the basis, with small modifications, for the subsequent ASW 27, ASW 28 and ASG 29. It was superseded in production by the ASW 28.

Variants
The ASW 24B of 1993 introduced winglets and a slightly revised airfoil that were partially successful in addressing the handling and performance issues.
The ASW 24E is a nominally self-launching variant employing a Rotax 275 engine and a propeller mounted on a retractable pylon. The engine installation is peculiar for its small size and power, more typical of a turbo, and for its manual start with a pilot-operated ripcord.

Specifications (ASW 24)

See also

References

Further reading

External links

Johnson R, An FTE of the Schleicher ASW-24, Soaring, May 1994
Alexander Schleicher website
Sailplane Directory

Schleicher aircraft
1980s German sailplanes
Aircraft first flown in 1987
T-tail aircraft